Jacob Walter Ruben (August 14, 1899 – September 4, 1942) was an American screenwriter, film director and producer. He wrote for more than 30 films between 1926 and 1942. He also directed 19 films between 1931 and 1940. His great-grandson is actor Hutch Dano. He was born in New York City and died in Hollywood. He is interred at Glendale's Forest Lawn Memorial Park Cemetery.

Selected filmography

 Shootin' Irons (1927)
 Under the Tonto Rim (1928)
 Sunset Pass (1929)
 She's My Weakness (1930)
 Shooting Straight (1930)
 Young Donovan's Kid (1931)
 The Public Defender (1931)
 The Phantom of Crestwood (1932)
 Ace of Aces (1933)
 Where Sinners Meet (1934)
 Man of Two Worlds (1934)
 Java Head (1934)
 Riffraff (1936)
 Trouble for Two (1936)
 Old Hutch (1936)
 The Good Old Soak (1937)
 The Bad Man of Brimstone (1937)
 Maisie (1939)
 Tennessee Johnson (1942)

References

External links

 

1899 births
1942 deaths
American film directors
American film producers
American male screenwriters
Burials at Forest Lawn Memorial Park (Glendale)
20th-century American male writers
20th-century American screenwriters